Pseudocercospora purpurea is a fungal plant pathogen that causes a leaf spot on the avocado.

References

External links
 Index Fungorum
 USDA ARS Fungal Database

Fungal tree pathogens and diseases
Avocado tree diseases
purpurea
Fungi described in 1976